Aboriella is a monotypic genus of flowering plants in the family Urticaceae, native to the eastern Himalaya, in the Abor Hills. The sole species is Aboriella myriantha.

Sometimes this genus is included in Pilea by some authors.

References 

 [Aboriella proposed as substitute for Smithiella].

Flora of Arunachal Pradesh
Monotypic Rosales genera
Urticaceae genera
Urticaceae